The Greece national women's cricket team is the team that represents Greece in international women's cricket. In April 2018, the International Cricket Council (ICC) granted full Women's Twenty20 International (WT20I) status to all its members. Therefore, all Twenty20 matches that will be played between Greece women and other ICC members after 1 July 2018 have been eligible for full WT20I status.

Records and statistics 
International Match Summary — Greece Women
 
Last updated 11 September 2022

Twenty20 International 
T20I record versus other nations

Records complete to WT20I #1211. Last updated 11 September 2022.

See also
 Greece national cricket team
 List of Greece women Twenty20 International cricketers

References

Women
Cricket
Women's national cricket teams